Behnam Behzadi (Persian: بهنام بهزادی, Behˈnām Behzādī, born July 24, 1972) is an Iranian director, screenwriter, editor and producer.

He’s one of the internationally acclaimed Iranian directors and his films have received multiple awards from national and international film festivals. His latest feature film Inversion appeared in the Un Certain Regard section of Cannes Film Festival official selection. This film also received the Best Picture award at Med Film Festival in Italy and the Best Picture and Best Screenplay awards at Jaipur International Film Festival in India. He has also won the Best Director award for We Only Live Twice (Before The Burial) from Granada film festival in Spain and received the Special Jury Prize for Bending The Rules at Mannheim-Heidelberg International Film Festival in Germany and Tokyo International Film Festival. He has also received the Audience Choice Award at Three Continents Festival and Fajr International Film Festival for the same film. Some of his other awards include Crystal Simorgh for Best Director and Crystal Simorgh for Best Film at the international section and Crystal Simorgh for Best Screenplay at the national section of the 31st Fajr International Film Festival.

Moreover, he is the founder of Maajara Film School, an online educational start-up aiming to utilize the most innovative educational methods available to help foster interest in filmmaking and provide professional training in a wide range of cinematic fields.

Life and career 
Behnam Behzadi Borujeni was born on July 24, 1972 in Borujen. He started his artistic activities as a teenager with theater and photography. Afterward, he took an interest in filmmaking and made his first short film Super 8 at the age of 16. He earned his Bachelor's degree in filmmaking at Iran Broadcasting University and then started making films professionally.

Behzadi has made over 20 short films, documentaries and television films, and 4 feature films. He has several essays and writings published in journals. He has also served as a member of the juries committee for various national and international festivals including Gothenburg Film Festival in Sweden. He has been teaching filmmaking to the students of Master’s degree in Tehran University of Art, Faculty of Cinema and Theater, and Soore University in Tehran since 2015.

Filmography

Feature films

Short films 

 Grandfather, 8 mm, 1988
 To Live, Film Video, 1992
 Today is Monday? 16 mm, 1993
 Day 1, Film Video, 1996
 Revenge, 16mm, 1999
 Father’s Stories (10 short films collection), Film Video, 2000
 We Went to the Riverside, Film Video, 2001

Awards 
Revenge: Winner of Isfahan’s International Film Festival for Children and Youth in 2010, Winner of the FIPA Award for Best Short Film in France, 2000 - We Went to the Riverside: Winner of Golden Kite Award for Best Picture at the 2005 Buenos Aires Film Festival in Argentina - Hide Your Words: Nominated for the Best Short Documentary Award at IDFA in Amsterdam, Netherlands, 2002 - Winner of the 2003 Silver Docs Special Jury Award in the U.S.

Documentary films 

 1989, Ashura, 8 mm
 1994, College, 16 mm
 1996, Hand and Straw, Film Video
 1997, Tile’s Blue Resonance, 16 mm
 2002, Hide Your Words, Film Video
 2003, Swan Songs (3 films collection), Film Video

Television films 
 Address (2001)
 The Glass Grudge (2009)
 The Second Heart (2010)
 Someone Else (2011)

References

External links 
 Behnam Behzadi (IMDB)
 Behnam Behzadi (Soureh Cinema)

 

1972 births
Living people
Iranian directors
Iranian film directors